This is a list of pathology mnemonics, categorized and alphabetized. For mnemonics in other medical specialities, see this list of medical mnemonics.

Acute intermittent porphyria: signs and symptoms

5 Ps:

Pain in the abdomen

Polyneuropathy

Psychological abnormalities

Pink urine

Precipitated by drugs (including barbiturates, oral contraceptives, and sulfa drugs)

Acute ischemia: signs [especially limbs]

6 P's:

Pain

Pallor

Pulselessness

Paralysis

Paraesthesia

Perishingly cold

Anemia (normocytic): causes

:

Acute blood loss

Bone marrow failure

Chronic disease

Destruction (hemolysis)

Anemia causes (simplified)
ANEMIA:

Anemia of chronic disease

No folate or B12

Ethanol

Marrow failure & hemaglobinopathies

Iron deficient

Acute & chronic blood loss

Atherosclerosis risk factors
"You're a SAD BET with these risk factors":

Sex: male

Age: middle-aged, elderly

Diabetes mellitus

BP high: hypertension

Elevated cholesterol

Tobacco

Carcinoid syndrome: components

CARCinoid:

Cutaneous flushing

Asthmatic wheezing

Right sided valvular heart lesions

Cramping and diarrhea

Cushing syndrome
CUSHING:

Central obesity/ Cervical fat pads/ Collagen fiber weakness/ Comedones (acne)

Urinary free corisol and glucose increase

Striae/ Suppressed immunity

Hypercortisolism/ Hypertension/ Hyperglycemia/ Hirsutism

Iatrogenic (Increased administration of corticosteroids)

Noniatrogenic (Neoplasms)

Glucose intolerance/Growth retardation

Diabetic ketoacidosis: I vs. II
ketONEbodies are seen in type ONEdiabetes.

Gallstones: risk factors
5 F's:

Fat

Female

Fair (gallstones more common in Caucasians)

Fertile (premenopausal- increased estrogen is thought to increase cholesterol levels in bile and decrease gallbladder contractions)

Forty or above (age)

Hepatomegaly: 3 common causes, 3 rarer causes

Common are 3 C's:

Cirrhosis

Carcinoma

Cardiac failure

Rarer are 3 C's:

Cholestasis

Cysts

Cellular infiltration

Hyperkalemia (signs and symptoms)
MURDER

Muscle weakness

Urine: oliguria, anuria

Respiratory distress

Decreased cardiac contractility

EKG changes (peaked T waves; QRS widening)

Reflexes: Hyperreflexia or areflexia (flaccid)

Hypernatremia (signs and symptoms)
FRIED SALT

FRIED

Fever (low), Flushed skin

Restless (irritable)

Increased fluid retention, Increased blood pressure

Edema (peripheral and pitting)

Decreased urinary output, Dry mouth

SALT

Skin flushed

Agitated

Low-grade fever

Thirst

Inflammatory Bowel Disease: which has cobblestones

Crohn's has Cobblestones on endoscopy.

Morphine: effects
MORPHINES:

Miosis

Orthostatic hypotension or "Out of it"

Respiratory depression

Pain suppression or Pneumonia

Histamine release or Hormonal alterations or Hypotension

Increased ICT or Infrequency (constipation, or urinary retention)

Nausea

Euphoria or Emesis

Sedation

Kwashiorkor: distinguishing from Marasmus
FLAME:

Fatty

Liver

Anemia

Malabsorption

Edema

Pancreatitis: causes

I GET SMASHED:

Idiopathic/Infection/Ischaemic

Gallstones

Ethanol

Trauma

Steroids/surgery

Mumps/malnutrition/mechanical obstruction/metabolic

Autoimmune : Vasculitis

Scorpion sting

Hyperlipidaemia/hypercalcaemia/hereditary/hyperparathyroidism/hypermagnesia

ERCP

Drugs : Isoniazid, Thiazides, Azathioprine, Valproic Acid, Estrogen

PKU findings
PKU:

Pale hair, skin

Krazy (neurological abnormalities)

Unpleasant smell

Pupils in overdose: morphine vs. amphetamine
"MorPHINE:Fine. AmPHETamine:Fat":

Morphine overdose: pupils constricted (fine).

Amphetamine overdose: pupils dilated (fat).

Pericarditis findings
PERICarditis:

Pulsus paradoxus

ECG changes

Rub

Increased JVP

Chest pain [worse on inspiration, better when leaning forward]

Gout vs. pseudogout: crystal lab findings

P
seudogout crystals are:

P
ositive birefringent

P
olygon shaped

Gout therefore is the negative needle shaped crystals.
Also, gout classically strikes the great Toe, and its hallmark is Tophi.

Signs of Chronic Liver Disease 

Asterixis, Ascites, Ankle oedema, Atrophy of testicles

Bruising

Clubbing/ Colour change of nails (leuconychia)

Dupuytren’s contracture

Encephalopathy / palmar Erythema

Foetor hepaticus

Gynaecomastia

Hepatomegaly

Increase size of parotids

Jaundice

References

pathology Mnemonics
+path
+